It Don't Mean a Thing is an album by jazz drummer Elvin Jones recorded in 1993 and released on the Enja label.

Reception 
The Allmusic review called the album "one of the most well-rounded sets he has ever led. The lineup of musicians is very impressive...  And as for the drummer, there is still no one around who has captured the sound and spirit of Elvin Jones".

Track listing 
All compositions by Keiko Jones except as indicated
 "Green Chimneys" (Thelonious Monk) - 6:58 
 "A Lullaby of Itsugo Village" (Traditional arranged Keiko Jones) - 6:04 
 "It Don't Mean a Thing (If It Ain't Got That Swing)" (Duke Ellington, Irving Mills) - 5:39 
 "Lush Life" (Billy Strayhorn) - 6:41 
 "Zenzo's Spirit" - 6:54 
 "A Flower Is a Lovesome Thing/Ask Me Now" (Strayhorn/Monk) - 9:06 
 "Bopsy" (Kevin Mahogany) - 4:18 
 "Fatima's Waltz" - 6:26 
 "A Change Is Gonna Come" (Sam Cooke) - 5:23

Personnel 
 [[Elvin Jones – drums 
 Nicholas Payton – trumpet
 Delfeayo Marsalis – trombone  
 Sonny Fortune – flute, tenor saxophone 
 Willie Pickens – piano
 Cecil McBee – bass
 Kevin Mahogany – vocals (tracks 4 & 7)

References 

Elvin Jones albums
1994 albums
Enja Records albums